This glossary of biology terms is a list of definitions of fundamental terms and concepts used in biology, the study of life and of living organisms. It is intended as introductory material for novices; for more specific and technical definitions from sub-disciplines and related fields, see Glossary of genetics, Glossary of evolutionary biology, Glossary of ecology, and Glossary of scientific naming, or any of the organism-specific glossaries in :Category:Glossaries of biology.

A

B

C

D

E

F

G

H

I

J

K

L

M

N

O

P

R

S

T

U

V

W

X

Y

Z

Related to this search
Index of biology articles
Outline of biology
Glossaries of sub-disciplines and related fields:
Glossary of botany
Glossary of ecology
Glossary of entomology
Glossary of environmental science
Glossary of genetics
Glossary of ichthyology
Glossary of ornithology
Glossary of scientific naming
Glossary of speciation
Glossary of virology

References

 
biology
Wikipedia glossaries using description lists